Zalim Saudagar is a Bollywood drama film. It was released in 1941. The film is also known as Merchant Of Venice. It was directed by J.J. Madan and starred Khalil, Kajjan, Rani Premlata, and Haider Bandi in the pivotal roles. Zalim Saudagar means "The Cruel Merchant"; this film was a film adaption of Shakespeare's Merchant of Venice, and was produced by the Radha Film Company of Calcutta.
The film is very difficult to obtain and few copies of it appear to exist.

References

External links
 

1941 films
1940s Hindi-language films
Indian drama films
1941 drama films
Indian black-and-white films
Hindi-language drama films